Tony Polhill (born 15 December 1947) is a New Zealand middle-distance runner. He competed in the men's 1500 metres at the 1972 Summer Olympics.

References

External links
 

1947 births
Living people
Athletes (track and field) at the 1972 Summer Olympics
Athletes (track and field) at the 1974 British Commonwealth Games
New Zealand male middle-distance runners
Olympic athletes of New Zealand
People from Waipawa
Commonwealth Games competitors for New Zealand
Sportspeople from the Hawke's Bay Region